Velleia montana, commonly known as mountain velleia, is a flowering plant in the family Goodeniaceae. It is a small, perennial herb with tubular yellow flowers, mainly growing in woodland and sub-alpine grasslands in New South Wales, Victoria and Tasmania.

Description

Taxonomy and naming
Velleia montana was first formally described in 1847 by Joseph Dalton Hooker and the description was published in the London Journal of Botany.
The specific epithet montana refers to mountains or coming from mountains.

Distribution and habitat
Mountain velleia grows at higher altitudes in woodland, subalpine swamps and grassland south of Boonoo Boonoo National Park, Tasmania and Victoria.

References

External links
  Occurrence data for Velleia montana from The Australasian Virtual Herbarium

montana
Flora of New South Wales
Flora of Tasmania
Flora of Victoria (Australia)